Indian was launched in Massachusetts in 1805, possibly under the same name. She first appeared in British records in 1814, suggesting that she was a prize. She was Liverpool-based and traded widely, especially with South America. She was in Valparaiso in 1820 when news of the discovery of the  South Shetland Islands and the sealing grounds there reached Valparaiso before it reached England. She sailed to the South Shetland Islands and gathered over 25,000 seal skins before returning to Liverpool. Thereafter, she returned to trading across the Atlantic. Her crew abandoned her in a waterlogged state on 17 August 1827.

Career
Indian first appeared in Lloyd's Register (LR) in 1814 with A.Hannay, master, S.Holland, owner. and trade Liverpool-Cadiz. It also gave her origin simply as "America" and her launch year as 1808. The Register of Shipping (RS) for 1814 agreed with LR on master and owner. However, it gave her trade as Liverpool–Havana, her origin as Massachusetts, and her launch year as 1805.

In 1819 Captain Ferdinand Spiller (or Sheller), sailed for the coast of Chile and Peru.

In June 1820 Indian sailed from Valparaiso for the newly discovered South Shetland Islands and their sealing grounds. Indian arrived back at Plymouth on 27 May 1821, having left the New South Shetlands on 13 March and Pernambuco on 21 April. She arrived in London on 29 May with 26,725 seal skins.

On 28 January 1822 Indian, Speller, master, arrived at Lisbon from Liverpool for Pernambuco. On 26 June she arrived back at Liverpool, having left Pernambuco on 21 April.

Fate
On 17 August 1827 Captain Berkley and his crew abandoned Indian at sea. She had  of water in her hold. The crew took to her longboat and reached Liverpool, Nova Scotia a few days later. Lloyd's List reported on 5 October that Indian had been wrecked at  while on her way from Saint John, New Brunswick, to Belfast. On 19 October Lloyd's List reported that Mayflower had seen an abandoned vessel at  that was believed to have been Indian.

Notes, citations, and references
Notes

Citations

References
 

1800s ships
Ships built in Massachusetts
Captured ships
Age of Sail merchant ships of England
Sealing ships
Maritime incidents in August 1827